Skyward in Triumph is the second studio album by godheadSilo, released on April 9, 1996 by Sub Pop.

Track listing

Personnel 
Adapted from the Skyward in Triumph liner notes.

godheadSilo
 Dan Haugh – drums
 Mike Kunka – bass guitar

Production and additional personnel
 godheadSilo – recording, mixing
 Tim Green – recording
 Michael Lastra – recording, mixing
 Joe Preston – recording, mixing

Release history

References

External links 
 

1996 albums
GodheadSilo albums
Sub Pop albums